The 2004 Women's Hockey Champions Trophy was the 12th edition of the Hockey Champions Trophy for women. It was held between 6–14 November 2004 in Rosario, Argentina.

The Netherlands won the tournament for the third time after defeating Germany 2–0 in the final.

Teams
The participating teams were determined by International Hockey Federation (FIH):

 (Defending champions)
 (Champions of 2004 Summer Olympics)
 (Host nation and champion of 2002 World Cup)
 (Second in 2004 Summer Olympics)
 (Fourth in 2004 Summer Olympics)
 (Sixth in 2004 Summer Olympics)

Squads

Head Coach: Sergio Vigil

Head Coach: David Bell

Head Coach: Kim Chang-back

Head Coach: Markus Weise

Head Coach: Marc Lammers

Head Coach: Ian Rutledge

Umpires
Below are the 8 umpires appointed by the International Hockey Federation:

Corinne Cornelius (RSA)
Carolina de la Fuente (ARG)
Alison Hill (ENG)
Soledad Iparraguirre (ARG)
Anne McRae (SCO)
Mónica Rivera Fraga (ESP)
Lisa Roach (AUS)
Kazuko Yasueda (JPN)

Results
All times are Argentina Time (UTC−03:00)

Pool

Classification

Fifth and sixth place

Third and fourth place

Final

Awards

Statistics

Final standings

Goalscorers

References

External links
Official FIH website
Official website

2004
2004 in women's field hockey
hockey
International women's field hockey competitions hosted by Argentina
Sport in Rosario, Santa Fe
November 2004 sports events